Charlbi Dean Kriek (5 February 1990 – 29 August 2022) was a South African actress and model. She was best known for her roles in the Spud films (2010–2013), the superhero drama series Black Lightning (2018) and the Palme d'Or-winning dark comedy Triangle of Sadness (2022).

Early life and career
Dean was born on 5 February 1990 to Joanne Muller and Johan Kriek. She had a brother. She began modelling at the age of 6, appearing in commercials and catalogues. She signed with Alfa Model Management when she was 12 and was homeschooled from the age of 14. She attended Waterfront Theatre School in her hometown of Cape Town, traveling widely for her career.

In October 2008, Dean and fellow model Ashton Schnehage survived a car crash. Her injuries included a broken wrist, four broken ribs, and a collapsed lung. She was hospitalised at Milnerton Medi-Clinic and received life-saving surgery. She took a break from her career after the accident.

In 2010, Dean made her acting debut in the film adaptation of Spud as Amanda, a role she reprised in the sequel Spud 2: The Madness Continues. She went on to star in the films Don't Sleep in 2017 and An Interview with God in 2018. Also in 2018, she landed the role of Syonide, a recurring character she played for two seasons of the Arrowverse series Black Lightning. In February 2020, she was cast in a leading role in Ruben Östlund's satirical film Triangle of Sadness, which premiered at the 2022 Cannes Film Festival and won the Palme d'Or. Her performance in the film received critical praise, with some considering it as what could have been her breakout role.

Personal life
Dean was engaged to fellow South African actor and model Luke Volker, whom she had been dating since 2018.

Death
On 29 August 2022, Dean was admitted to a hospital in New York City after feeling unwell. While her initial symptoms were mild, her condition deteriorated rapidly and she died several hours later; she was 32. Autopsy results released on 21 December 2022 confirmed the actress died of bacterial sepsis, which was caused by Capnocytophaga. Her spleen had been removed after a 2008 car crash, which increased the risk of serious infections. Dean's death occurred shortly before the international release of Triangle of Sadness. Peter Bradshaw of The Guardian wrote that she "was a true star-in-the-making. Her loss is a huge one... [she] had a singular style and enormous promise."

Filmography

Film

Television

References

External links
 Charlbi Dean at Facebook
 Charlbi Dean at Instagram
 

1990 births
2022 deaths
Afrikaner people
21st-century South African actresses
Actresses from Cape Town
Child models
Deaths from sepsis
IMG Models models
Next Management models
South African female models
South African film actresses
South African television actresses